Here Comes the Sun is a 1946 British comedy film directed by John Baxter and starring Bud Flanagan, Chesney Allen and Elsa Tee. The film follows a sports reporter, on the run from the police, as he tries to clear his name.

The film's sets were designed by the art director Duncan Sutherland.

Cast

References

External links

1946 films
1946 comedy films
1940s English-language films
Films directed by John Baxter
British comedy films
Films set in England
British black-and-white films
1940s British films